Cuschieri is a surname. Notable people with the surname include:

Alfred Cuschieri, Maltese academic and surgeon
Anastasio Cuschieri (1872–1962), Maltese poet, politician, and philosopher
Joseph Cuschieri (born 1968), Maltese politician
Rachel Cuschieri (born 1992), Maltese women's footballer